Ryan Matthew Goins (born February 13, 1988) is an American professional baseball second baseman and shortstop in the Kansas City Royals organization. He has previously played in Major League Baseball (MLB) for the Toronto Blue Jays, Royals, and Chicago White Sox.

Amateur career
Goins attended Stony Point High School in Round Rock, Texas, where he played on his school's baseball team as a shortstop. He then enrolled at Dallas Baptist University, where he played college baseball for the Dallas Baptist Patriots from 2007 to 2009. In three seasons, Goins hit 32 home runs and recorded 117 runs batted in (RBIs). In 2009, he set the Patriots record for home runs in a single season with 22. In 2008, Goins played for the Waterloo Bucks in the Northwoods League during the offseason.

Professional career

Minor league career

The Blue Jays drafted Goins in the fourth round of the 2009 MLB draft. He was assigned to the Rookie Gulf Coast League Blue Jays, and also played for the Short Season Auburn Doubledays and Class-A Lansing Lugnuts in 2009, collectively batting .246 with 17 RBIs. In 2010, Goins played 77 games with the Lugnuts and batted .308 before he was promoted to the Advanced-A Dunedin Blue Jays. In 124 total games in 2010, Goins batted .271 with 3 home runs and 53 RBIs. Apart from 1 rehab game in the Gulf Coast, Goins played the entire 2011 season in Dunedin, and batted .284 with 3 home runs and 52 RBIs.

Goins played for the Double-A New Hampshire Fisher Cats in 2012, batting .289 with 7 home runs and 61 RBIs in a career-high 136 games played. After the season ended Goins played 13 games with the Salt River Rafters of the Arizona Fall League, and hit .133 with 5 RBIs. The Blue Jays added him to their 40-man roster after the 2012 season. For most of the 2013 season, Goins played for the Triple-A Buffalo Bisons. He was batting .257 with 6 home runs and 46 RBIs for the Bisons before his promotion.

Toronto Blue Jays

2013–2014
Goins was called up by the Blue Jays on August 22, 2013, when Maicer Izturis was placed on the 15-day disabled list. He made his MLB debut on August 23, batting ninth and playing second base against the Houston Astros. Goins would later move to shortstop and finished the game 2–4 with a double. He recorded his first career RBI on August 25 when he grounded out in the ninth inning. On August 31, 2013, Goins tied a Blue Jays franchise record by hitting in his 8th consecutive game to begin his major league career. Jesse Barfield also opened his career with an 8-game hitting streak in 1981. Goins' hit streak ended at 8 games on September 1 against the Kansas City Royals, when he went 0–4 with 2 strikeouts. He hit his first big league home run on September 18, off David Huff of the New York Yankees, and would finish the season with a .252 average, 2 home runs, and 8 RBIs.

Goins attended 2014 spring training, seeing regular playing time at second base. He was announced as the starting second baseman for the Blue Jays on March 24, after posting a batting average of just .176. He was optioned to Triple-A Buffalo on April 28. On July 22, Goins was recalled from Buffalo. He set career-highs in both hits and RBI, with 4 each, in a 14–1 win over the Boston Red Sox on July 28. He was sent down once again, before being called up on September 1. In total for 2014, Goins batted .188 with 1 home run and 15 RBI in 67 games.

2015–2017
Goins did not make the 2015 Opening Day roster out of spring training, with Toronto opting to open the season with an eight-man bullpen. On April 16, he was recalled from Buffalo after Todd Redmond was designated for assignment. Goins became the starting shortstop on April 28, as José Reyes was placed on the disabled list with a cracked rib. After Reyes returned from the disabled list on May 25, Goins remained with the Blue Jays as a utility infielder. On July 26, he became the starting second baseman due to an injury to Devon Travis. It was at this time that Blue Jays' hitting coach, Brook Jacoby, made a change to Goins' batting stance. Rather than hold the bat above his shoulder while awaiting a pitch, Jacoby had Goins lower the bat and rest it on his shoulder before swinging. The change paid immediate dividends, as Goins experienced the most productive month of his career, batting .314 with two home runs, 16 walks, and an .885 on-base plus slugging (OPS) in August. On September 1, Goins hit a two-run walk-off home run in the 10th inning to defeat the Cleveland Indians 5–3. Goins would record the first five-hit game for a shortstop in franchise history on September 30, aiding the Blue Jays to a division-clinching 15–2 victory over the Baltimore Orioles. Goins played in a career-high 128 games in the 2015 regular season, and batted .250 with five home runs and 45 RBI. He played in all five games of the 2015 American League Division Series, and went hitless in 17 at-bats. In game 3 of the 2015 American League Championship Series against the Kansas City Royals, Goins hit his first postseason home run, drove in three runs and scored twice to help Toronto to an 11–8 win. 

Goins began the 2016 season as the team's primary second baseman, with Devon Travis still recovering from offseason shoulder surgery. On July 1, 2016, Goins made his professional pitching debut, being pressed into service in the 18th inning of a 19 inning marathon game against the Cleveland Indians. Goins was placed on the 15-day disabled list the following day with forearm tightness. He was activated on August 1, and optioned to Buffalo on August 2. On August 19, Goins was recalled from Triple-A. He finished the 2016 regular season with a .186 batting average, three home runs, and 12 RBI. Goins was on the Wild Card roster but did not play in the game. He was not on the Division Series roster. During the Division Series, Devon Travis suffered a knee injury that kept him out of the lineup for two games. With team management unsure of Travis' health, Goins was added to the Championship Series roster.

Goins recorded the first grand slam of his career in the Blue Jays 8–4 win over the Milwaukee Brewers on May 24, 2017. 
He led MLB in 2017 with 10 bases-loaded hits. On December 1, 2017, Goins was non-tendered by the Blue Jays, making him a free agent.

Kansas City Royals
On January 24, 2018, Goins signed a minor league contract with the Kansas City Royals that included an invitation to spring training. Goins earned a spot on the Royals' Opening Day Roster. Goins was designated for assignment on June 28. He was assigned outright to the Omaha Storm Chasers on July 2, and elected free agency.

Philadelphia Phillies
Goins signed a minor league contract with the Philadelphia Phillies on July 3, 2018, and was assigned to the Triple-A Lehigh Valley IronPigs, for whom he batted .220/.291/.315. He elected free agency on November 2, 2018.

Chicago White Sox
On December 10, 2018, Goins signed a minor league contract with the Chicago White Sox that included an invitation to spring training. On March 26, 2019, he was sent to minor league camp to play for the Triple-A Charlotte Knights. On July 17, Goins was called up and made his White Sox debut that same day. Goins had 2 hits with a 2-run home run in his first game with the club. On October 28, the White Sox outrighted Goins off of the roster. Goins elected free agency on October 31.

Oakland Athletics
Goins signed a minor league contract, with an invitation to major league spring training, with the Oakland Athletics on November 25, 2019. He was released on July 19, 2020.

Second stint with the White Sox
On July 23, 2020, Goins signed a minor league contract with the Chicago White Sox. On July 27, his contract was purchased and he was called up to the major leagues. On August 31, Goins was designated for assignment by the White Sox. He elected free agency on September 28.

Atlanta Braves
On February 26, 2021, Goins signed a minor league contract with the Atlanta Braves organization. Goins spent the year with the Triple-A Gwinnett Stripers, slashing .233/.305/.330 with 6 home runs and 35 RBI in 91 games with the team. He elected minor league free agency following the season on November 7.

On March 13, 2022, Goins re-signed with the Braves organization on a new minor league deal. On August 16, 2022, Goins' contract was selected from Triple-A Gwinnett. He didn't appear in a game and was designated for assignment on August 22. On the year, he played in 90 games for Triple-A Gwinnett, slashing .217/.244/.257 with no home runs and 25 RBI. On October 17, Goins elected free agency.

Kansas City Royals (second stint)
On January 31, 2023, Goins signed a minor league contract with the Kansas City Royals organization.

References

External links

1988 births
Living people
People from Round Rock, Texas
Baseball players from Texas
American baseball players of Mexican descent
American expatriate baseball players in Canada
Major League Baseball shortstops
Toronto Blue Jays players
Kansas City Royals players
Chicago White Sox players
Dallas Baptist Patriots baseball players
Gulf Coast Blue Jays players
Auburn Doubledays players
Lansing Lugnuts players
Dunedin Blue Jays players
New Hampshire Fisher Cats players
Buffalo Bisons (minor league) players
Major League Baseball second basemen
Salt River Rafters players
Lehigh Valley IronPigs players
Charlotte Knights players
Baseball players at the 2020 Summer Olympics
Olympic baseball players of Mexico
Waterloo Bucks players